Velikanova House is a mansion and an architectural monument in the city of Rostov-on-Don, Russia. It was built in 1884—1890 on the project of architects Nikolay Doroshenko and Nikolay Sokolov. Today the building is occupied by Rostov Art College named after M.B. Grekov.

Description 
In 1884—1890, Rostov-on-Don merchant Semyon Ivanovich Velikanov had a mansion built for his daughter Pelageya on Kazanskaya Street (now Serafimovich Street). There she lived with her husband, Matvei Kirillovich Kozlov, who was a speaker of Rostov-on-Don City Duma and a mining engineer. The mansion had 28 rooms, several cellars and a fountain in the courtyard. The facades of the building were decorated in Neoclassical style.

In 1921, the mansion was nationalized and Karl Marx Rostov-on-Don State Library (now Don State Public Library) was opened there.

In 1994, the library was moved to another building on Pushkinskaya Street, and since then Velikanova Mansion houses Rostov Art College named after M.B. Grekov.

References

Residential buildings completed in the 19th century
Buildings and structures in Rostov-on-Don
Cultural heritage monuments in Rostov-on-Don
Cultural heritage monuments of regional significance in Rostov Oblast